Rodéo, written and drawn by Morris, is an album containing three stories from serial publication in Spirou magazine during 1948–49, namely Grand rodéo ("Grand Rodeo"), Lucky Luke à Desperado City ("Lucky Luke in Desperado City") and La ruée vers l'or de Buffalo Creek ("The Buffalo Creek Gold Rush"). Together they were released as the second Lucky Luke hardcover album in 1951, and in English by Cinebook as the 54th in 2015.

Stories

Grand Rodéo

Synopsis 
Lucky Luke arrives in Navajo City, a town about to stage a rodeo. In the saloon of the place he meets Cactus Kid, a thug who attacks him, but is no match for Luke. The rodeo takes place the next day. Presumed the favourite to win by the town and himself, Cactus Kid realises he may have met his match in Lucky Luke, and resorts to foul play, sabotaging Luke's lasso and then trying to cut the strap of his saddle. This time, Lucky Luke takes him by the wayside and beats him up. Luke wins the rodeo but Cactus Kid takes revenge by grabbing the prize money. The sheriff and several men run after him, but it is Lucky Luke who succeeds in capturing him.

Characters 

 Cactus Kid: The town tough, he is Lucky Luke's main opponent during the rodeo.

Lucky Luke à Desperado City

Synopsis 
Lucky Luke arrives in Desperado City, where two desperados, the Pistol Brothers, appear to be the source of local terror. They quickly confront Luke who captures them during a stagecoach attack. However, the town is flooded with bandits, unwilling to accept the enforcement of the law, and Lucky Luke finds himself attacked from every direction. The undertaker is the boss of all these people who free the Pistol brothers and succeed in capturing Lucky Luke. He was barely saved from hanging by a panicked herd of cattle. Lucky Luke then succeeds in neutralizing the undertaker (who benefits from the lawlessness), then the Pistol brothers. He then renames the city "Justice City".

Characters 

 Pistol brothers: Bandit brothers who rule Desperado City.
 Bill Boney: The Sheriff of Desperado City - cowardly and incompetent, he shamelessly hides during gunfights. He later appears in the album Hors-la-loi.

La ruée vers l'or de Buffalo Creek

Synopsis 
Lucky Luke spots a sleeping prospector, and decides to play a practical joke on him, planting a little gold nugget in the pan. The prospector awakes to his greatest dream come true, and when Lucky Luke chases the euphoric gold digger and tries to reveal the joke, the prospector shoots at him, speeding into town to stake his claim and shout the news. The madness of a gold rush follows, bringing changes to Buffalo Creek of a greater scale than Lucky Luke expects, and when he makes a final attempt to explain the truth, he finds himself arrested. Unable to remedy the situation from inside a jail cell, Luke must let the situation run its course, a change coming undone as quickly as it started, as an expert examines the gold nugget and realizes that it was discovered in California fifty years ago. Buffalo Creek then empties of its inhabitants, becoming a ghost town.

Characters 

 Joe: Old gold digger who believes he discovered gold at Buffalo Creek.
 Bill McCoy: Mayor (for a few hours) of Buffalo Creek.

References

 Morris publications in Spirou BDoubliées

External links
Lucky Luke official site album index 

Comics by Morris (cartoonist)
Lucky Luke albums
1951 graphic novels
Works originally published in Spirou (magazine)
Literature first published in serial form